Symphony is an instant messaging service aimed at financial firms. It supports encryption, group messaging, rich content sharing and third-party plugins. Symphony is developed by Symphony Communication Services.

History
The technology was first built as an internal messaging system by Goldman Sachs called Live Current. In October 2014, Goldman Sachs, along with 14 other financial institutions, invested $66 million to create Symphony Communication Services LLC,  and acquired Perzo, Inc., a secure communication application that provided end-to-end encryption messaging.

Perzo was founded by David Gurle in 2012. He served as Symphony's CEO from 2014 to 2021. Perzo was involved in developing the communication offerings at Skype, Thomson Reuters, and Microsoft.

Symphony 2.0 was announced at the company’s annual Innovate Conference, which took place in New York City in October 2019.  The new version promised a customizable user interface and smart notifications.  Software components, called Elements, were intended for use in custom applications built on Symphony. This version was released one year later.

In 2020, the company claimed to have  over 400,000 users on the Symphony platform.

Brad Levy joined the firm in July 2020 as president and chief commercial officer. He was named chief executive officer in June 2021, after former founder David Gurlé stepped down from the executive role. Levy had worked at Goldman Sachs and IHS Markit prior to joining Symphony.

Funding

In September 2014, fifteen financial firms invested in Symphony, including Bank of America, BNY Mellon, and others.

In October 2015, Symphony announced it had raised $100 million in a new round of funding led by Google, with additional investment from Lakestar, Natixis, and other firms.

In May 2017, it raised $63 million in additional funding from BNP Paribas as well as its existing investors, bringing the company's total valuation above $1 billion.

In June 2019, Symphony announced a $165 million funding round with a valuation of $1.4 billion. The funding came from Standard Chartered,  MUFG Innovation Partners, and other unnamed current and new investors. Symphony has raised $460 million since September 2014.

The company's final round of funding was in December 2020. During the series E round, the company raised $50 million from current investors.

Acquisitions

On November 28, 2014, Symphony Communication Services LLC acquired technology assets developed by Collaboration Services, the open messaging network from Markit Ltd. for an undisclosed amount.

On August 2, 2021, Symphony Communication Services LLC acquired the counterparty mapping platform StreetLinx.

License
The Symphony Software Foundation has announced it would use the Apache License 2.0 to provide the software as open-source. The contributions will be made available under the foundation's GitHub repository.

References

External links 

Reason - UK implementation partner

Project management software
Collaborative software
Goldman Sachs